Two People is a 1952 West German historical romantic drama film directed by Paul May and starring Edith Mill, Helmuth Schneider, and Gustav Waldau. It was shot at the Bavaria Studios in Munich and on location around the Dolomites and in Rome. It was based on the 1911 novel of the same title by Richard Voss set in South Tyrol in the late nineteenth century.

Cast

See also
 Two People (1924 film)
 Two People (1930 film)

References

Bibliography

External links 
 

1952 films
1952 romantic drama films
German romantic drama films
West German films
1950s German-language films
Films directed by Paul May
Films set in the 1890s
Films based on German novels
German historical romance films
1950s historical romance films
Remakes of German films
Films about Catholic priests
Films set in the Alps
German black-and-white films
1950s German films
Films shot at Bavaria Studios
Films shot in Rome